The Escadrille Chérifienne (Cherifian Squadron) or Escadrille Américaine (American Squadron) was an American squadron fighting for the French colonial Empire during the Rif War. It was attached to the Moroccan Royal Guard, or Garde Chérifienne.

Formation 
Colonel Charles Sweeny, an American pilot who had served in World War I, proposed organizing a squadron of American pilots to assist the French in Morocco, to French Prime Minister Paul Painlevé, who "warmly welcomed the Colonel’s request."

Seeking "volunteers," Sweeny sent a telegram to a number of World War I veterans in the US in June 1925. By July, he had 17 volunteers, 12 of whom were pilots, including Paul Ayres Rockwell, had served France in World War I. The American volunteers were inducted into the French Foreign Legion in July, and their squadron was named Escadrille Cherifienne, 19th Squadron of the Moroccan Aviation Regiment. It was legally attached to the Sultan's Guard, and not to French forces.

In a telegram to the French résident général in Morocco Hubert Lyautey, the Prime Minister and Minister of War of France Paul Painlevé said: "This American expression of solidarity seems particularly interesting at the moment and capable of bringing a share of American propaganda to our cause, strengthening American sentiment against the aggression of Abd el-Krim."

Operations 

The unit was activated on August 7, 1925. It operated seven Bréguet 14 light bombers. The Squadron was assisted by a 59-man French ground crew.

In Morocco, the American volunteers of the Escadrille Cherifienne were based in Beni Malek. The Escadrille bombed the Moroccan city of Chefchaouen on September 17, 1925.

The Escadrille was cited at the order of the (French) Occupation Troops of Morocco on October 15, 1925.

Polemics 
The US Department of State instructed its consul at the American Legation in Tangier, Maxwell Blake, to warn the Americans that they would risk the revocation of their US citizenship, imprisonment, and fines if they battled "against a people with whom the United States had no quarrel." The American opinion was shocked by American pilots killing Rifian people. The French Left also saw Rifian commander Abd el-Krim as a Republican leader fighting for liberty.

The French aviators in Morocco and the French new commander Philippe Pétain disapproved the use of foreign mercenaries.

The Squadron was disbanded on November 1925, 15.

Members 

 Colonel Charles Michael Sweeny
 Captain Paul Ayres Rockwell
 Commander James Sussan/Susson, Canadian former commander pilot in the Royal Air Force of England
 Donald Mac Gibeny, former pilot of United States Air Force
 Captain Samuel J. Mustain, former pilot of United States Air Force
 Doctor James V Sparks, who enlisted as a medic
 Captain George Butts
 George Rehm
 Lieutenant Charles W. Kerwood
 Commander Grandville Pollock
 Lieutenant-Colonel Austin G. Parker
 Captain Reginald H. Weller
 Captain Graham
 Captain Lansing C. Holden
 Captain William G. Bullin
 Lieutenant William S. Cousins

Motivation 
On the motivation of the rogue American volunteer pilots, Sweeney wrote, "In our view, France, in fighting Abdel Krim, is fighting the cause of the white man's civilization, and all who have formed this squadron know enough of the world to appreciate what the white man's civilization means."

Most of the pilots were interested in an adventurous life and the historian William Dean refutes the importance of the White supremacist views of the pilots.

References 

Rif War
French expatriate units and formations
Military units and formations established in 1925
Military units and formations disestablished in 1925
Mercenary units and formations
American mercenaries